is a railway station on the Kyūdai Main Line operated by JR Kyushu in Yufu, Ōita Prefecture, Japan.

Lines

Layout 
The station consists of a side platform serving a single track at grade. From the access road, a short flight of steps leads up to the track bed where a level crossing is used to cross the track to reach the platform. There is no station building but an enclosed shelter is provided.

Adjacent stations

History
The Daito Railway was nationalized on 1 December 1922, after which Japanese Government Railways (JGR) undertook the next phase of expansion of what it designated as the Daito Line, extending the track and opening Yunohira as the new western terminus on 29 September 1923. On the same day, Tenjinyama was opened as an intermediate station along the new track. On 15 November 1934, when the Daito Line had linked up with the Kyudai Main Line further west, JGR designated the station as part of the Kyudai Main Line. With the privatization of Japanese National Railways (JNR), the successor of JGR, on 1 April 1987, the station came under the control of JR Kyushu.

Passenger statistics
In fiscal 2015, there were a total of 40,304 boarding passengers, giving a daily average of 110 passengers.

See also
 List of railway stations in Japan

References

External links
Tenjiyama (JR Kyushu)

Railway stations in Ōita Prefecture
Railway stations in Japan opened in 1923